This list of Algeria national football team records contains statistical accomplishments related to the Algeria national football team, its players, and its managers. The Algeria national team represents the nation of Algeria in international football. It is fielded by the Algerian Football Federation and competes as a member of Confederation of African Football.

Records

Individual 

Most appearances
Lakhdar Belloumi, 100, 22 October 1978 — 17 November 1989

Most appearances as a captain
 Yazid Mansouri, 52, 5 June 2004 — 5 June 2010

Most goals

 Islam Slimani, 40, 2012 —

Longest Algeria career
 Djamel Menad, (31 May 1980 — 30 July 1995)
 Rabah Madjer, (28 October 1978 — 17 January 1992)

Oldest player
 Raïs M'Bolhi, 

Youngest player
 Tahar Chérif El-Ouazzani, 30 December 1984

Most appearances at the World Cup finals
 Rafik Halliche, 7, 13 June 2010 — 30 June 2014

Appearances at Two World Cup final tournaments
 Lakhdar Belloumi, 1982 and 1986
 Tedj Bensaoula, 1982 and 1986
 Madjid Bougherra, 2010 and 2014
 Mahmoud Guendouz, 1982 and 1986
 Rafik Halliche, 2010 and 2014
 Nourredine Kourichi, 1982 and 1986
 Mehdi Lacen, 2010 and 2014
 Raïs M'Bolhi, 2010 and 2014
 Rabah Madjer, 1982 and 1986
 Faouzi Mansouri, 1982 and 1986
 Djamel Mesbah, 2010 and 2014
 Hassan Yebda, 2010 and 2014
 Djamel Zidane, 1982 and 1986

Most goals scored at the World Cup finals Salah Assad, 2, 24 June 1982
 Abdelmoumene Djabou, 2, 22 June 2014 — 30 June 2014
 Islam Slimani, 2, 22 June 2014 — 26 June 2014

Most appearances at the African Championship finals
 Rabah Madjer, 22, 9 March 1980 — 17 January 1992

Appearances at Six African Championship final tournaments
 Rabah Madjer, 1980, 1982, 1984, 1986, 1990, and 1992
 Mahieddine Meftah, 1990, 1992, 1996, 1998, 2000, 2002

Most goals scored at the African Championship finals
 Lakhdar Belloumi, 6, 13 March 1980 — 26 March 1988
 Riyad Mahrez, 6, 19 January 2015 — present

Most appearances on aggregate at the World Cup and African Championship finals
 Rabah Madjer, 28, 9 March 1980 — 17 January 1992

 Appearances in three different decades
 Rabah Madjer, 1970s, 1980s, 1990s
 Mahieddine Meftah, 1980s, 1990s, 2000s
 Moussa Saïb, 1980s, 1990s, 2000s
 Rafik Saïfi, 1990s, 2000s, 2010s

Manager 
Most matches as coach
 Rabah Saâdane, 74, 30 August 1981 — 3 September 2010

Most matches won as coach
 26 by Djamel Belmadi

Most matches drawn as coach
 21 by Rabah Saâdane

Most matches lost as coach
 23 by Rabah Saâdane

Most goals scored as coach
 90 by Djamel Belmadi

Team 
Largest victory
 15–1, South Yemen – Algeria, 17 August 1973

Largest away victory
 0–6, Jordan – Algeria, 28 September 1974

Largest defeat
 5–0, East Germany – Algeria, 21 April 1976

Largest home defeat
 5–2, Algeria – Nigeria, 4 September 2005

Most consecutive victories
 9, 26 May 1975 — 6 January 1976

Most consecutive matches without a defeat
 35, October 2018 - January 2022

Most consecutive defeats

Most consecutive matches without a victory
 11, 3 February 2004 — 17 November 2004

Longest period without conceding a goal

Highest home attendance
 110,000, Algeria – Serbia, 3 March 2010

Highest away attendance
 100,000, Iran – Algeria, 27 September 1991

Hat-tricks
As of 22 April 2021.

 6 Player scored 6 goals

Doubles
44 players managed to score 2 goals in the same match. 17 have done it more than once, for a total of 82 doubles.
8 doubles: I. SLIMANI; 
6 doubles: Abd. TASFAOUT
5 doubles: R. MAHREZ
4 doubles: R. DALI, R. MADJER, Dj. MENAD, H.E. SUDANI, 
3 doubles: R. SAÏFI
2 doubled: A. DRAOUI, T. BENSAOULA, L. BELLOUMI, M. SAÏB, A. MECABIH, H. MERAKCHI, S. FEGHOULI, Y. BRAHIMI, B. BOUNEDJAH

Fastest goals
As of September 30, 2017.

8 players scored in the first minute of the game. It is  :
AT . SAFSAFI on 17. 8. 1973 against DR YEMEN (Arab Cup)
S. ASSAD on 28. 10. 1978 against ZAMBIA (Friendly)
L. BELLOUMI the 6. 4. 1979 against MALI (JO / EL)
T. BENSAOULA the 6. 1. 1984 (59 ) v EGYPT (JO / EL)
Dj. MENAD on 25. 2. 1986 against MOZAMBIQUE (Friendly)
F. KADIR on 15.6.2012 (16 ") against GAMBIA (CAN / EL)
Y. BRAHIMI on 10.15. 2014 (54 ") against MALAWI (CAN / EL)
Y. BRAHIMI on 17.11.2015 (36 ") against TANZANIA (CDM / EL)

Biggest wins
Scores from 6–0 and up

Heaviest defeats
Scores from 4–0 and up

 Youngest player Italics denotes players still playing club football, Bold denotes players still playing in the national team.

 Most appearances at the Africa Cup of Nations Italics denotes players still playing club football, Bold denotes players still playing in the national team.

 Most appearances at the africa Cup of Nations and world Cup Italics'' denotes players still playing club football, Bold denotes players still playing in the national team.

Home record

References 

Record

External links 

Records
Algeria national football team records and statistics
National association football team records and statistics